Paula Andrea Patiño Bedoya (born 29 March 1997) is a Colombian racing cyclist, who currently rides for UCI Women's WorldTeam . She rode in the women's road race event at the 2018 UCI Road World Championships.

Patiño won Stage 2 of the Vuelta a Colombia Femenina in 2018.

She competed at the 2020 Summer Olympics.

References

External links
 

1997 births
Living people
Colombian female cyclists
Sportspeople from Antioquia Department
Olympic cyclists of Colombia
Cyclists at the 2020 Summer Olympics
20th-century Colombian women
21st-century Colombian women